The Ezras Torah Fund was founded on August 25, 1915 (15 Elul, 5675) at a meeting in Congregation Mishkan Israel in the Lower East Side of New York.  The meeting was conducted by members of the Agudas HaRabbanim and the Vaad HaRabbanim of New York.  It was an outgrowth of the Central Relief Committee (CRC) that was created to assist Orthodox Jews in Europe during World War I.  The CRC had been founded in late 1914 by the Union of Orthodox Jewish Congregations of America with much help from the aforementioned rabbinical organizations.  Ezras Torah's role was to specifically assist town rabbis, roshei yeshiva, and yeshivas during the upheaval years of World War I.  They eventually broadened their scope to a worldwide level after the war.

The founding leadership of Ezras Torah was composed of Rabbi Israel Rosenberg, Rabbi Dr. Philip Klein (aka Hillel HaKohen) and Rabbi Yaakov Eskolsky.  Rabbi Rosenberg was president until his passing in 1956.  Rabbi Klein was treasurer until his passing in 1926.  Rabbi Eskolsky was secretary until 1928.

The personality who would be most prominently associated with Ezras Torah was Rabbi Yosef Eliyahu Henkin.  He served as the director of Ezras Torah from the summer of 1925 until his passing in 1973.

Leadership (1915–present)

Publications
Sefer HaZikaron, c. 1919
Zichron B'Sefer, 1922
Luach HaYovel Shel Ezras Torah, c. 1936
Eidus L'Yisroel, c. 1946
She'eris Yisroel, 1956
Luach Minhagei Beis HaKnesses, annually from 1969–present

References

Further reading
משה יעקב אסקוט, "ראשית דרכו של מוסד 'עזרת תורה' (תרע"ה - תרפ"ה)", ישורון כרך לב, ניו יורק\ירושלים תשע"ה (2015), עמ' תתקז-תתקלז
משה יעקב אסקוט, "עוד על ראשית דרכו של מוסד 'עזרת תורה'", ישורון כרך מה, ניו יורק\ירושלים תשפ"ב (2022), עמ' א'צא-א'צו

External links
http://www.ezrastorah.org

Jewish refugee aid organizations
Haredi Judaism in New York (state)
Jewish community organizations
Jewish organizations based in the United States
Religious organizations established in 1915
1915 establishments in New York (state)